Gian Marco Crespi (born 28 June 2001) is an Italian professional footballer who plays as a goalkeeper for  club Juventus Next Gen, on loan from Crotone.

Club career
On 31 January 2020, Crespi signed with Crotone and was loaned back to Gozzano until the end of the 2019–20 season.

On 22 May 2021 he made his serie A debut in Crotone–Fiorentina.

On 2 August 2021 he went to Renate on loan.

On 26 August 2021 he joined Pistoiese on loan.

On 22 July 2022, Crespi was loaned by Picerno.

On 24 January 2023, he was loaned to Juventus Next Gen. In February of the same year, he received his first call-up to Juventus' first team for the first leg of the UEFA Europa League knockout play-off against Nantes.

Club statistics

References

External links
 

2001 births
Living people
Sportspeople from Udine
Footballers from Friuli Venezia Giulia
Italian footballers
Association football goalkeepers
Serie A players
Serie C players
Udinese Calcio players
A.C. Gozzano players
F.C. Crotone players
A.C. Renate players
U.S. Pistoiese 1921 players
AZ Picerno players
Juventus Next Gen players